Sara or Sarah Lane may refer to:

People
 Sara Malakul Lane, actress and model
Sarah Lane, ballet dancer
 Sarah Lane (theatre manager) (died 1899), British actress,  playwright and theatre manager
Sarah Lane, host on Daily Tech News Show and former host on TWiT.tv and Revision3 podcasts
Sara Lane, actress in The Virginian (TV series)

Fictional characters
Sara Lane, character in The Edge of Night
Sara Lane, character in I Kissed a Vampire

See also